The 2002 Dubai World Cup was a horse race held at Nad Al Sheba Racecourse on Saturday 23 March 2002. It was the 7th running of the Dubai World Cup.

The winner was Godolphin's Street Cry, a four-year-old bay or brown colt trained in Dubai by Saeed bin Suroor and ridden by Jerry Bailey. Street Cry's victory was a record fourth in the race for Bailey, the third for bin Suroor and the second for Godolphin.

Street Cry was originally trained in the United States by Eoin Harty and finished third the Breeders' Cup Juvenile before being transferred to Saeed bin Suroor's stable in 2001. As a three-year-old he ran only three times, and recorded a win in the UAE 2000 Guineas. In the following year he was prepared for the World Cup by winning the second round of the Al Maktoum Challenge in February. In the 2002 Dubai World Cup he started the 9/2 second favourite and won by four and a quarter lengths from the Argentinian-bred outsider Sei Mei with the 2/5 favourite Sakhee four and a quarter lengths away in third place.

Race details
 Sponsor: none
 Purse: £4,109,589; First prize: £2,465,753
 Surface: Dirt
 Going: Fast
 Distance: 10 furlongs
 Number of runners: 11
 Winner's time: 2:01.18

Full result

 Abbreviations: DSQ = disqualified; nse = nose; nk = neck; shd = head; hd = head; nk = neck

Winner's details
Further details of the winner, Street Cry
 Sex: Stallion
 Foaled: 11 March 1998
 Country: Ireland
 Sire: Machiavellian; Dam: Helen Street (Troy)
 Owner: Godolphin
 Breeder: Sheikh Mohammed

References

Dubai World Cup
Dubai World Cup
Dubai World Cup
Dubai World Cup